The Linggi River is a river in Malaysia which flowing through the states of Negeri Sembilan and Malacca. It starts from the foothills of the Titiwangsa Range in Kampung Jerlang, Pantai in Seremban District, flowing westwards through the towns of Ampangan, Seremban, Rasah, Mambau and  Rantau in the same district, Linggi in Port Dickson District and ends at the small coastal hamlet of Kuala Linggi in Alor Gajah District, Malacca, where a 360-metre long bridge connecting the two states is located.

See also
 List of rivers of Malaysia
 Port of Kuala Sungai Linggi

References

Rivers of Negeri Sembilan
Rivers of Malacca